Lady Mary Victoria Douglas-Hamilton, also known as Mary Victoria Hamilton (11 December 185014 May 1922), was a Scottish noblewoman who was the great-grandmother of Prince Rainier III of Monaco, Prince Karl Johannes von Schwarzenberg and Princess Ira von Fürstenberg, and the great-great grandmother of Albert II, Prince of Monaco.

Life

She was born as the youngest child and the only daughter of William Hamilton, 11th Duke of Hamilton and of his wife, Princess Marie Amelie of Baden.

Hereditary Princess of Monaco
Her first marriage, on 21 September 1869 at Château de Marchais, was to Prince Albert, only child and heir apparent of Charles III, Prince of Monaco.  The marriage was arranged upon the wish of the Monegasque princely house, as it had long been an ambition of his mother and grandmother to marry him to a member of the British royal house.   While Queen Victoria refused a match between Albert and one of her closer family members, Lady Mary was suggested as a suitable replacement.  

They had a single son, Louis, who would take the throne of Monaco upon his father's death. Their marriage was annulled by the Church on 3 January 1880, although civilly it was dissolved only on 28 July 1880, by order of Prince Charles III.

Life in Hungary

Lady Mary Victoria’s second marriage, on 2 June 1880, was to Count Tassilo Festetics de Tolna. The couple had four children, Countess Mária Matild Georgina (1881–1953), who married Prince Karl Emil von Fürstenberg;
Prince György (1882–1941); Countess Alexandra Olga Eugénia (1884–1963), who married Prince Karl von Windisch-Graetz; and Countess Karola Friderika Mária (1888—1951), who married Oskar Gautsch Freiherr von Frankenthurn.

During her 40-year marriage to Count, later Prince, Tassilo Festetics de Tolna, Lady Mary oversaw the enlargement and improvement of the main family seat, Festetics Palace, and its gardens, in Keszthely, western Hungary.

On numerous occasions, she and her husband entertained her brother the Duke of Hamilton and his great friend the Prince of Wales. There are still portraits hanging in the Palace of numerous members of her family, including one of her father in full Highland dress. Outside the palace, on either side of the main entrance, there are the armorial bearings of both Lady Mary and her husband.

The Helikon Library at the Palace contains many works that were brought to Keszthely by Lady Mary from her father’s and brother's collections at Hamilton Palace.

The Palace grounds, on the shores of Lake Balaton, contains a Festetics family Mausoleum which is the final resting place of Lady Mary and her husband.

References

1850 births
1922 deaths
Hereditary Princesses of Monaco
Daughters of British dukes
Mary Victoria Hamilton
Mary Victoria Hamilton
Mary Victoria Hamilton
Scottish people of Belgian descent
Scottish people of French descent
Scottish people of German descent
Scottish people of Portuguese descent
Scottish socialites
People from South Lanarkshire
Scottish expatriates in Monaco